The 2016 Coastal Carolina Chanticleers baseball team represented Coastal Carolina University in the 2016 NCAA Division I baseball season.  The Chanticleers played their home games at Springs Brooks Stadium, on campus in Conway, South Carolina.  Gary Gilmore was in his 21st season as the Chanticleers' coach. They won the 2016 College World Series, and with it the 2016 NCAA Division I National Championship, at TD Ameritrade Park in Omaha, Nebraska over Arizona.

Personnel

Roster

Coaches

Schedule

Rankings

References

Coastal Carolina Chanticleers baseball seasons
Coastal Carolina Chanticleers
Big South Conference baseball champion seasons
Coastal Carolina Chanticleers
College World Series seasons
NCAA Division I Baseball Championship seasons